The electrochemical window (EW) of a substance is the electrode electric potential range between which the substance is neither oxidized nor reduced.  The EW is one of the most important characteristics to be identified for solvents and electrolytes used in electrochemical applications. The EW is a term that is commonly used to indicate the potential range and the potential difference. It is calculated by subtracting the reduction potential (cathodic limit) from the oxidation potential (anodic limit). 

When the substance of interest is water, it is often referred to as the water window.

This range is important for the efficiency of an electrode, out of this range, the electrolyte will react at the electrode interface. In the case of water, it gets electrolysed, spoiling the electrical energy that is intended for another electrochemical reaction.

Materials

Platinum (very expensive)
(boron-)doped CVD diamond films on titanium or niobium: 3.5 - 1.5 V (undoped diamond does not conduct electricity)

References

Electrochemistry